Sorare is a fantasy sport video game available for Android, iOS and web browsers. It was developed in 2018 by Nicolas Julia and Adrien Montfort. The sports that are on Sorare include football, basketball, and baseball.

Concept 
Players compose and manage virtual teams of five players with digital player cards based on the cryptocurrency "Ethereum".

Some of the cards are digital collectibles (limited, rare, super-rare and unique cards). These cards are Non-Fungible, so they cannot be duplicated.

Teams are ranked based on the performance of their players on the real-world, as is common in traditional fantasy sports. These points are calculated utilizing a scoring matrix taking third party data from Opta, where each player can score up to a maximum of 100 points depending on how they perform. This is also very similar to other fantasy football leagues in that users keep the same players on their team every season, unless they choose to trade, drop, or sign new ones.

Development 
Sorare operates on Ethereum's underlying blockchain network in order to secure the ownership and distribution of cards. Each player card is represented as a non-fungible token (NFT) using the ERC-721 token standard on Ethereum. The licensing partnerships Sorare signs with leagues, such as the K League and clubs such as Real Madrid, allows the Sorare cards to have the official branding with the season's player photos and player names. As of 2 August 2022, over 280 clubs are present in the game.

History 
In May 2019, the company announced a pre-seed round of €550,000, including the technology entrepreneur Xavier Niel.

In July 2020, the company raised $4 million with German football World Cup champion André Schürrle, among others.

In December 2020, the company raised another €3.5 million with World Cup champion Gerard Piqué, among others.

In September 2021, the company raised $680 million Series B round, which valued the company at $4.3 billion. Also in September, Sorare formalized an agreement with the Spanish football league for a multi-year partnership. The agreement covers the edition of virtual cards for players playing in La Liga and Liga.

In March 2022, Sorare was released on iOS.

On May 12, 2022, Sorare signed a partnership with Major League Baseball to continue to develop sports on its platform. The launch of the game based on baseball and MLB was made on July 19, 2022.

In September 2022, Sorare signed a multi-year partnership with the National Basketball Association (NBA) and the National Basketball Players Association (NBPA). After a year of negotiations, the NBA allowed Sorare to use its logos while the NBPA licensed its players names, images and likeness rights to Sorare.

In October 2022, Sorare was released on Android.

In November 2022, Lionel Messi joined Sorare as an investor and brand ambassador. Other investors include Kylian Mbappe and Serena Williams.

On January 30, 2023, Sorare signed a partnership with the English Premier League for the purchase and use official Premier League-licensed NFTs.

References

External links 
 Official website

2019 video games
Association football video games
Blockchains
Browser games
Digital collectible card games
Fantasy sports
Video games developed in France